KMIZ (channel 17) is a television station licensed to Columbia, Missouri, United States, serving the Columbia–Jefferson City market as an affiliate of ABC and MyNetworkTV. It is owned by the News-Press & Gazette Company (NPG) alongside low-power Fox affiliate KQFX-LD (channel 22, also licensed to Columbia). The two stations share studios on the East Business Loop 70 in Columbia; KMIZ's transmitter is located west of Jamestown near the Moniteau–Cooper county line.

History
KMIZ went on the air for the first time on December 5, 1971, as the ABC affiliate KCBJ-TV. Before then, ABC had been relegated in the Central Missouri market to secondary clearances on NBC affiliate KOMU-TV (channel 8) and CBS affiliate KRCG (channel 13). KCBJ was originally owned by the brothers Richard & Robert Koenig, under the name Channel 17 Inc. The station's original studios were located on South 7th Street in Columbia.

On August 8, 1982, KCBJ and KOMU swapped affiliations. ABC had become the nation's highest-rated network and had been looking to get its programming on higher-rated stations. It found the chance to align with long-dominant KOMU too much to resist. The Koenigs sold the station to Stauffer Communications in 1984. By 1985, however, KOMU was one of several ABC affiliates across the country that were disappointed with the network's weak programming offerings, particularly in daytime. Meanwhile, NBC regained the ratings lead, and the two stations returned to their original networks on New Year's Day 1986. Along with the switch, channel 17 changed its call letters to the current KMIZ. Stauffer merged with Morris Communications in 1995 but Morris was not allowed to keep the former Stauffer television stations. As a result, the former Stauffer television holdings, including KMIZ, were sold to Benedek Broadcasting in 1996. In the late 1990s, KMIZ owner Benedek Broadcasting launched two low-powered stations, K02NQ in Columbia and K11TB in Jefferson City, to bring Fox to Mid-Missouri. It also operated the cable-only WB 100+ affiliate "KJWB" (known on-air as "WB 5" from its cable channel location) from its launch in 1998 until 2002. Benedek went bankrupt later in 2002, and most of its stations, including KMIZ, were sold to Gray Television. "KJWB" transferred ownership to the University of Missouri (owners of KOMU), and KMIZ was divested to Chelsey Broadcasting. Chesley in turn sold the station to JW Broadcasting in May 2003.

In late 2003, JW Broadcasting moved the Fox affiliation for the Columbia–Jefferson City market to a new low-power station, K38II. The company also launched "KZOU" as a cable-only UPN affiliate in Mid-Missouri. Additionally, the station launched the country's first 24-hour local weather channel, known as Show-Me Weather.

In 2006, UPN merged with The WB to form The CW Television Network, while at the same time Fox established MyNetworkTV for displaced affiliates. When "KJWB", the WB 100+ station owned by KOMU-TV, took the CW affiliation through The CW Plus, KZOU was quick to grab the MyNetworkTV affiliation. The next year, Show-Me Weather was rebranded as ABC 17 Stormtrack 24/7, taking on an increased focus on local weather.

On July 26, 2012, JW Broadcasting announced the sale of KMIZ and KQFX-LD to News-Press & Gazette Company for $16 million. The sale made the two stations the second and third in Missouri to be owned by News-Press & Gazette Company (which owns Fox affiliate and television flagship KNPN-LD in Saint Joseph). NPG CEO David Bradley currently serves as Chairman of the Board of Curators that runs the University of Missouri. This has led to questions whether Bradley's roles at NPG and MU might result in the deal violating FCC rules that prohibit common ownership of two of the four highest-rated stations in a single media market. In the FCC purchase filing, News-Press & Gazette argues that Bradley has had no personal involvement in KOMU's operations. The sale was consummated on November 1.

News operation
Historically, KMIZ's newscasts have ranked a distant third in the market behind KOMU and KRCG. Not only is it the market's youngest station, but it also suffered from being a UHF station in a market where its competitors are on VHF. Many viewers weren't able to get a clear picture from the station until cable gained penetration in Mid-Missouri in the early 1980s.

On October 10, 2011, KMIZ launched the market's first prime access newscast at 6:30 p.m., and became the second station in the Columbia–Jefferson City market to offer all local newscasts, syndicated programming and commercials in high definition.

With the debut of its high definition newscasts and the market's only 6:30 p.m. newscast, KMIZ now offers five hours of local news every weekday. It also broadcasts a nightly 9 p.m. newscast on its sister station, KQFX-LD, for a full hour on weeknights and a half-hour on weekends. On September 2, 2013, KMIZ added weekday newscasts at 9 a.m. and noon.

Notable former on-air staff
Savannah Guthrie – anchor/reporter (now anchor for Today)

Technical information

Subchannels
The station's digital signal is multiplexed:

Before KQFX-LD was aired from its own transmitter in Mid-Missouri, it was found on digital channel 17-2 via PSIP at standard definition of 480i. It has since been replaced by MeTV.

Stormtrack 24/7 was found on 17-4 via PSIP. On January 9, 2012, KMIZ discontinued the Stormtrack 24/7 weather channel on digital subchannel 17.2 and replaced it with MeTV.

A simulcast of KQFX-LD was added to the KMIZ multicast on 17.4 on or around March 29, 2015. This provides viewers, especially in Audrain, Macon, and Randolph counties access to Fox programming via traditional OTA antennas.

Analog-to-digital conversion
KMIZ shut down its analog signal over UHF channel 17, on June 12, 2009, the official date in which full-power television stations in the United States transitioned from analog to digital broadcasts under federal mandate. The station's digital signal relocated from its pre-transition UHF channel 22 to channel 17 for post-transition operations. JW Broadcasting LLC was also awarded a new low-power digital license for its Fox affiliate on UHF channel 22 (under the callsign KQFX-LD).

MyZou TV
KMIZ and its two formerly-operating low-power sibling stations, K11TB and K02NQ, have a fairly complex history. K02NQ was founded in 1990, with K11TB signing on in 1991. K11TB would gradually share a Fox affiliation with K02NQ from 1997 to 2003. K11TB would end up becoming K38II in 2004, when another co-owned station (K11SN) signed on (K11SN was an affiliate of the American Independent Network before it went dark due to AIN going dark and was sold to JW Broadcasting), and adopted those call-letters, with the original KZOU-LP becoming KQFX-LD. With the sign-on of the digital simulcasts on KMIZ's subchannels, K02NQ and KZOU-LP ended analog over-the-air transmissions and had their licenses voluntarily canceled by the FCC, with only KQFX-LD remaining over-the-air as a separate station. KMIZ, KQFX, and MyZou TV were branded together as "The Network of Mid-Missouri."

KMIZ 17.3 is identified through PSIP as KZOU-TV. An HD feed of MyZou TV is available on Dish Network, DirecTV, Mediacom (Jefferson City and most of Columbia), and Suddenlink (Boonville and St. Martins) but is not available over-the-air or via Charter Spectrum (Lake of the Ozarks, Columbia outlying areas, and other Mid-Missouri communities).

References

External links

ABC network affiliates
MeTV affiliates
MyNetworkTV affiliates
Bounce TV affiliates
News-Press & Gazette Company
Television channels and stations established in 1971
1971 establishments in Missouri
MIZ